Pherne is a genus of moths in the family Geometridae described by George Duryea Hulst in 1896.

Species
Pherne parallelia (Packard, 1873)
Pherne placeraria (Guenée, 1857)
Pherne sperryi McDunnough, 1935
Pherne subpunctata (Hulst, 1898)

References

Ourapterygini